Leonard McRae (born 13 September 1947) is a Guyanese cricketer. He played in ten first-class matches for Guyana from 1970 to 1978.

See also
 List of Guyanese representative cricketers

References

External links
 

1947 births
Living people
Guyanese cricketers
Guyana cricketers
Sportspeople from Georgetown, Guyana